Joseph Francis Hanselman (October 28, 1856 – January 16, 1923) was an American Catholic priest and member of the Society of Jesus. In the academic world, he served as the president of the College of the Holy Cross and rector of Woodstock College. He also was the superior of the Maryland-New York Province of the Jesuits and as the American assistant to the Jesuit Superior General in Rome.

Biography 
Joseph Francis Hanselman was born in the Williamsburg neighborhood of the city of Brooklyn, New York (then independent of New York City) on October 28, 1856. He was born to Margaret and Henry Hanselman and had eight siblings. Of his six brothers, five became priests; both of his sisters became nuns. His brothers were James, John Thomas, George, Michael, and his sisters assumed the religious names of Vincent and Thomasina.

He attended Saint Vincent College in Pennsylvania before completing his education at St. Francis Xavier College in New York City, where he graduated in 1877. Following his secular education, Hanselman entered the Grand Séminaire de Montréal. However, soon thereafter, he instead decided to enter the Jesuit Order at West Park, New York in 1878. After some time teaching at St. Peter's College in Jersey City, he completed his formation Woodstock College and was ordained a priest in 1892.

Hanselman was made the dean of studies and discipline at the College of the Holy Cross in 1893, where he remained until being appointed the president of the college in 1901. As president, he was responsible for overseeing the construction of Alumni Hall.

He became the provincial superior of the Maryland-New York Province of the Society of Jesus on March 25, 1906, succeeding Thomas J. Gannon. He remained in this position until becoming the rector of Woodstock College in 1912; he was succeeded as provincial by Anthony Maas. In 1918, Hanselman was elevated to the position of American assistant-general to the Jesuit Superior General. He was the second person to hold this office. Unlike his predecessor, Gannon, Hanselman initially remained in the United States while holding the position, rather than move to Rome, due to the fighting of World War I. He held this post until his death on January 16, 1923. He was succeeded as the American assistant by Anthony Maas, S.J.

References

Citations

Sources 

 

1856 births
1923 deaths
People from Williamsburg, Brooklyn
Presidents of the College of the Holy Cross
Rectors of Woodstock College
Woodstock College alumni
Saint Vincent College alumni
Xavier High School (New York City) alumni
Grand Séminaire de Montréal alumni
19th-century American Jesuits
20th-century American Jesuits
Provincial superiors of the Jesuit Maryland Province